The Central American and Caribbean Athletic Confederation (CACAC) is a confederation governing body of athletics for national governing bodies and multi-national federations within Central America and the Caribbean. Membership of the Confederation is open to all national governing bodies for the sport of athletics in any country or territory in the region which is affiliated to World Athletics. Other countries may be granted observer status and may, with permission of the Congress, be allowed to compete in open championships. They will, however, not be entitled to vote at the Congress.

The Central American and Caribbean Athletic Confederation (CACAC) should not be confused with the North American, Central American and Caribbean Athletic Association (NACAC) established later in 1988, being one of the official area associations of World Athletics, and also including federations from Canada and the USA. CACAC considers NACAC as its parent organization,
and the CACAC constitution regulates that the World Athletics Area Representative of NACAC is an ex-official member

History
With the initiative of the Mexican representative Carlos de Anda Dominguez, at the 10th
Central American and Caribbean Games held in June 1966 in the city of San Juan, Puerto Rico, the need for the formation of a Central American and Caribbean Athletic
Confederation was discussed as well as a proposal for organizing the first Central American and Caribbean Championships.

The first Championships were held on the 5th and 6 May 1967, in  Jalapa,
Veracruz, México. Discussion about the formation of the Confederation was started at
this time.

In Winnipeg, Canada, during the celebration of the V Pan American Games, a
tentative constitution was approved, a permanent committee elected and the site of the
second Central American and Caribbean Championships was awarded to Cali, Colombia,
for August 1969, with Havanna, Cuba, as the alternate site.

The Constitution was finally adopted on the occasion of the second
Championships in August 1969. It has been revised and amended at General Assemblies
in Guadalajara, Mexico, June 16, 1979; San Juan, Puerto Rico, July 5, 1979; Nassau,
Bahamas, August 22, 1980; Santo Domingo, Dominican Republic, July 11, 1981;
Maracaibo, Venezuela, August 18, 1998; Bridgetown, Barbados, June 27, 1999, San
Juan, Puerto Rico, July 16, 2000, Bridgetown, Barbados, July 7, 2002 and San Salvador,
El Salvador, December 4, 2002, Havana, Cuba, July 5, 2009, Santo Domingo 2010,
Mayaguez 2010.

Presidents
The current president of the confederation, Alain Jean-Pierre of Haiti was elected at the CACAC Congress held in San Salvador, El Salvador, in 2012. He follows
Víctor López of Puerto Rico, who was elected firstly in Maracaibo, Venezuela, in 1998, and re-elected in Grenada in 2003, and in Cali, Colombia, in 2008.

Competitions
CACAC organises five different championships: senior championships, junior championships, cross country championships, age group championships and under-17 (youth) championships.

Central American and Caribbean Senior Championships
Central American and Caribbean Junior/Youth Championships
Central American and Caribbean Cross Country Championships
Central American and Caribbean Age Group Championships

A Central American and Caribbean Half Marathon Cup was held once in Negril in 2005, incorporated into the Reggae Marathon in Jamaica, but did not get renewed after this debut event after only two nations entered.

Member federations
CACAC consists of 34 member federations and 5 observer members: 29 of the member federations are members of NACAC (all NACAC members are represented except the federations from Canada and the USA), and 5 of the member federations are members of CONSUDATLE (Colombia, Guyana, Panama, Suriname, and Venezuela). The 5 observer members are non-World Athletics members.

Former member associations

At their Council Meeting, the IAAF announced, that because the Netherlands Antilles has ceased to exist as a separate territory (one of 21 IAAF Members that are not countries but territories), athletes will not compete anymore as AHO but as Holland, and IAAF membership will drop from 213 to 212.  The CACAC published the decision in their own newsletter.  Curaçao, one of the five former island territories of the Netherlands Antilles, was invited as observer member.

See also
Association of Panamerican Athletics (APA)
North American, Central American and Caribbean Athletic Association (NACAC)
South American Athletics Confederation (CONSUDATLE)
Central American Isthmus Athletic Confederation (CADICA)

References

External links
Former website

Athletics organizations
Sports organizations established in 1967
Ath
Ath
Ath
Athletics (track and field) in North America
Central America and the Caribbean